The Harrow is a Grade II listed public house at Harrow Lane, Steep, Hampshire GU32 2DA.

It is on the Campaign for Real Ale's National Inventory of Historic Pub Interiors.

The Guardian calls it "one of Britain's timeless, rural watering holes", on a quiet country lane that becomes a footpath as it reaches a small stream by the pub, which dates back to the 16th century. English Heritage notes that the current building was built in the 18th century.

References

Grade II listed pubs in Hampshire
National Inventory Pubs